The Cameroon women's national football team has represented Cameroon at the FIFA Women's World Cup on two occasions, in 2015 and 2019.

FIFA Women's World Cup record

Record by opponent

2015 FIFA Women's World Cup

Group C

Round of 16

2019 FIFA Women's World Cup

Group E

Round of 16

Goalscorers

References

 
Countries at the FIFA Women's World Cup